Byerly is a surname. Notable people with the surname include:

Alice Sudduth Byerly (1855–1904), temperance activist
Alison Byerly, American educator
Bud Byerly, (1920–2012), American baseball player
Chester Byerly, (1918–1984), American politician
Hayden Byerly, (born 2000), American child actor
Josh Byerly, NASA employee
Kathleen Byerly, (1944–2020), United States Navy officer
Robert Byerly (1916–1945), American-born Canadian soldier who was a spy for the British SOE during World War II

See also
Byerley
Mount Byerly, mountain of Antarctica
Byerly House, historic house in Pennsylvania, United States